Huwen op Bevel (also known as Terpaksa Menikah, both meaning Forced to Marry) is a 1931 romance film from the Dutch East Indies (now Indonesia). Directed by G. Krugers and thought to have been produced by Tan's Film, it follows two young lovers who are nearly separated but can ultimately be together. A critical flop, it was Krugers's last as a director. It is likely lost.

Plot
A young Indonesian intellectual falls in love with a woman. Although she loves him, she is told to marry an older man, one who has gone on the hajj. Ultimately they are able to be together.

Production
Huwen op Bevel was directed by the Indo director G. Krugers and produced by Krugers in collaboration with Tan Khoen Yauw of Tan's Film. The Indonesian film historian Misbach Yusa Biran suggests that Krugers, whose last film Karnadi Anemer Bangkong (1930) was produced by his own Krugers Filmbedrijf in Bandung, had run out of funds during production and thus began working for Tan; he credits this to Karnadi Anemer Bangkong failure. Concurrently with his work on Huwen op Bevel, for which he also handled the cinematography, Krugers likely served as cameraman for Tan's talkie version of Njai Dasima, directed by Bachtiar Effendi.

The film's dialogue was in Malay. Songs were sung by the kroncong group Tembang Ketjapi.

Release and reception
Huwen op Bevel was released in 1931, although several sources list it as being from 1932. It screened in Batavia (now Jakarta) in August, reaching Medan in late September and Surabaya by mid-October. The film was advertised as having full sound, including music and singing. Later advertisements compared it with Tan's production, Njai Dasima. It was advertised as the first sound film in the Indies and referred to as such by some later writings. Biran, however, writes that Krugers's earlier film Karnadi Anemer Bangkong featured sound.

Huwen op Bevel received negative reviews. One in the Batavia-based Het Nieuws van den dag voor Nederlandsch-Indië found the film to lack contrast and have poor vocal synchronisation; the reviewer summarised that "turning the crank is not enough; a filmmaker must master the technique". The film was a commercial failure and proved Krugers's last film. He left the Indies in 1936 and moved to Hong Kong, where he died in 1937.

Huwen op Bevel is likely a lost film. The American visual anthropologist Karl G. Heider writes that all Indonesian films made before 1950 are lost. However, JB Kristanto's Katalog Film Indonesia (Indonesian Film Catalogue) records several as having survived at Sinematek Indonesia's archives, and Biran writes that several Japanese propaganda films have survived at the Netherlands Government Information Service. Some contemporary reviews gave Indonesian-language translations of the title, like Nika Terpaksa. More recent sources have given the translation Terpaksa Menikah.

Explanatory notes

Footnotes

Works cited

Dutch East Indies films
1930s romance films
Films directed by G. Krugers
Indonesian black-and-white films
Indonesian romance films
Malay-language films